is a Japanese television drama series that aired on TBS from 14 January to 4 March 2011. The theme song of the series is Anomii by amazarashi.

Cast
 Umika Kawashima as Ai
 Yoshiko Mita
 Gō Ayano as Shion
 Yūta Nakano as Naruki
 Hirotarō Honda
 Ryū Morimiya
 Seika Taketomi
 Kazuki Namioka
 Hirofumi Araki
 Tarō Suruga

References

External links
  

Japanese drama television series
2011 Japanese television series debuts
2011 Japanese television series endings
TBS Television (Japan) dramas